Qimei Reservoir, also known as Ch'i-mei Reservoir, is a reservoir located in Donghu Village,Qimei Township, Penghu County. It is the only reservoir and the main source of water on Qimei Island.

The construction of the Qimei Reservoir started on 1 June 1990 and was completed on 1 October 1991. It has a catchment area of 1.14 square kilometers and a designed effective water storage capacity of about 230,000 cubic meters.

See also
 List of dams and reservoirs in Taiwan

References

1991 establishments in Taiwan
Reservoirs in Taiwan
Geography of Penghu County
Buildings and structures in Taiwan
Buildings and structures completed in 1991